Orlové is a part of the city Považská Bystrica in northwestern Slovakia. It joined the city in 1971.
In Orlove is situated a manor house from 1612  inside of it Kaplnka sv. Jána Nepomuckého.

Demography 
Orlové had in 2009 655 inhabitants.

Geography 
Area of Cadastral district of Orlove is 6 044 291 m².

Location
Distance from Orlove to Považská Bystrica is  2,8 km.

References

External links 
 

Populated places in Slovakia